The Remote Video Inspection System (RVIS) was deployed by United States in the late 1990s at select low-traffic border entry points from Canada. The system allowed passport and customs inspections to be conducted remotely, so that low-risk travelers could enter the country during hours that the border station did not have on-site staff. The system was successfully deployed at a number of entry points, in six different states. RVIS was discontinued following the September 11 attacks.

Conception
In the early 1990s, the Immigration and Naturalization Service (INS) was interested in finding ways to enable low-risk travelers to enter the United States from Canada at small ports of entry after inspection services had ended for the day.  INS commissioned its contractor EDS, as well as the Department of Transportation John A. Volpe National Transportation Systems Center and its contractors Labblee Inc. and Bishop Systems to develop and deploy a system that transmitted audio, video and data to an inspector at a nearby 24-hour port of entry.  The system was originally named "Remote Inspection Communicator And Remote Document Observer" (RICARDO), but the name was changed to Remote Video Inspection System (RVIS) prior to its first deployment.

Deployment
RVIS consisted of a series of pan–tilt–zoom cameras (PTZ), an amplified speakerphone, a card reader and a telecommunications device for the deaf (TDD). There were vehicle sensors at the Canada–United States border that initiated the system, and exit sensors that alerted operators that a drive-by had occurred.  There were also area lights, a text display and a traffic signal.  Some ports of entry had electronic gates for traffic management.  Inspectors at the remote location could control the PTZ cameras, and conduct a verbal interview with the driver and passengers.
 
The first two RVIS sites were at the border crossings of Forest City and Orient in Maine in 1996. By 2000, RVIS systems had been deployed at 18 of 22 planned locations:

 Closed since 2006
 Closed since 2013

RVIS was planned for the Morses Line Border Crossing in Vermont, but local residents opposed its installation. However, in 2016, the Canadian side implemented a similar system.

Decommission
The RVIS system never achieved its full potential because its deployment pre-dated the rollout of high speed data networking at all ports of entry, which caused the video transmission to be slow and cumbersome. Its usage was suspended following the September 11 attacks, and the RVIS system was officially decommissioned on November 1, 2002.

See also
PORTPASS
U.S. Customs and Border Protection

References

Further reading
 

Immigration to the United States
Videotelephony